DYRK (96.3 FM), broadcasting as 96.3 WRocK, is a radio station owned and operated by Exodus Broadcasting Company, Inc.. The station's studio and transmitter are located at Room 2016, 20th Floor, Golden Peak Hotel and Suites, Gorordo Ave. cor. Escario St., Brgy. Camputhaw, Cebu City. It operates daily for 5:00 am to 11:00 pm.

Background
Exodus Broadcasting Company was established by the Hodreal family on October 2, 1993, and operated as a sister company of ACWS-UBN. It launched WRocK in Cebu province.

Except for the acquisition price, further terms were not disclosed. While DWRK since then has been under the control of MBC, ACWS-UBN and Exodus retain control of the WRocK provincial stations. In the same year, ACWS-UBN decided to re-establish the original WRocK format via online streaming, branding it as "WRocK Online" through Hayag.com, while DYRK was relaunched as a separate entity from WRocK Online.

In June 2016, the station removed the "Cebu" suffix on its branding". This was done to reflect that DYRK is the sole station bearing the WRocK brand.

See also
 WRocK Online

References

External links

Radio stations established in 1993
Radio stations in Metro Cebu